Moses Margolies or Moshe ben Shimon Margalit (c. 1715 in Kėdainiai, Lithuania – 1781 in Brody, then a private town of the Polish Crown) was a Lithuanian Jewish rabbi and a commentator on the Jerusalem Talmud.

Works
Margolies is best known as the author of a dual commentary on the Jerusalem Talmud, which is printed in the standard Vilna and Szatmár editions of the text. His general glosses, which he called by the name of Pnei Moshe (the face of Moses), was intended to make the often choppy text of the Jerusalem Talmud easier to read. His second commentary, which he called Mareh Panim (showing of face), is meant to take up more complex legal issues and often surveys the Babylonian Talmud and the corpus of post-Talmudic law and commentary as well. This format of two commentaries, simple and complex, was meant to mimic the Rashi and Tosafot commentaries on the Babylonian Talmud. This style became popular among commentators on the Jerusalem Talmud and is used by Margolies' contemporary, Rabbi David Fränkel as well as by Rabbi Jacob David Wilovsky, among others.

References

1710s births
1780 deaths
18th-century Lithuanian rabbis
Talmudists
Authors of works on the Jerusalem Talmud
Hebrew-language writers
Rabbis from Kėdainiai